KOMODO or Multilateral Naval Exercise KOMODO (MNEK) is a military exercise by the Indonesian Navy (TNI-AL). It is annually held between the Indian Ocean and the Pacific Ocean. The first KOMODO was held in 2014, around Batam.

Its aims are to enhance facilitating multilateral engagement with greater international partners. Three exercises have taken place: 2014, 2016 and 2018.

History

MNEK 2014 (1st)
The exercise consists of a total of 18 countries and took place around Batam, Natuna and Anambas area.

Australia backed out of the exercise due to political reasons.

MNEK 2014 participating vessels: 

JS Akebono (DD-108)
BRP Ramon Alcaraz (PS-16)
KDB Darulehsan (07)
INS Sukanya (P50)
Khánh Hòa-01 (HQ-561)
Changbai Shan (989)
KRI Dr. Soeharso (990)
KRI Tanjung Nusanive (973)
KRI Tanjung Kambani (971)
KRI Soputan (923)
KRI Arun (903)
KRI Alamang (644) 
KRI Makassar (590)
KRI Teluk Cirebon (543)
KRI Teluk Parigi (539)
KRI Teluk Hading (538)
KRI Teluk Banten (516)
KRI Pati Unus (384)
KRI Imam Bonjol (383)
KRI Sultan Iskandar Muda (367)
KRI Sultan Hasanuddin (366)
KRI Yos Sudarso (353)
KAL Bireuen (II-1-63)
KAL Kumai (I-6-58)
KAL Antasena (1)

MNEK 2016 (2nd)
It lasted from 9 to 16 April 2016. Alongside the exercise, an International Fleet Review was also hosted at Padang, Indonesia. This particular exercise consists of 36 countries.
MNEK 2016 participating vessels: 

USS Stockdale (DDG-106)
JS Ise (DDH-182)
KDB Daruttaqwa (09)
RSS Tenacious (71)
Khánh Hòa-01 (HQ-561)
INS Sumedha (P58)
HTMS Narathiwat (OPV-512)
KRI Halasan (630)
KRI Makassar (590)
KRI Teuku Umar (385)
KRI Pati Unus (384)
KRI Cut Nyak Dien (375)
KRI Frans Kaisiepo (368)
KRI Oswald Siahaan (354)
KRI Yos Sudarso (353)
KRI Slamet Riyadi (352)
KD Mahawangsa (1504)
KD Kelantan (F175)
BNS Somudra Avijan (F29)
SNLS Samadura (P261)
Vendémiaire (734)
Admiral Vinogradov (572)
Weifang (550)
Changxingdao (861)

MNEK 2018 (3rd)
The exercise began on 4 May and lasted until 9 May 2018 around Lombok Island. Indonesia claimed that it was the largest iteration of MNEK with 43 countries participating with China and India participating. Alongside the exercise, an International Fleet Review was also hosted.

MNEK 2018 participating vessels: 

Liuzhou (573)
Changsha (173)
USNS Millinocket (T-EPF-3)
Perekop (310)
JS Ōsumi
Dixmude (L9015)
Surcouf (F711)
HMAS Anzac (FFH 150)
HTMS Krabi (OPV-551)
Khánh Hòa-01 (HQ-561)
KD Baung (3509)
KRI Dr. Soeharso (990)
KRI Cakalang (852)
KRI Sidat (851)
KRI Tongkol (813)
KRI Kakap (811)
KRI Pandrong (801)
KRI Kujang (642)
KRI Clurit (641)
KRI Barakuda (633)
KRI Banjarmasin (592)
KRI Makassar (590)
KRI Ki Hajar Dewantara (364)
KRI Fatahillah (361)
KRI Yos Sudarso (353)
KRI Ahmad Yani (351)
KRI I Gusti Ngurah Rai (332)
BRP General Mariano Alvarez (PS-38)
BRP Gregorio del Pilar (PS-15)
RSS Formidable (68)
SLNS Sagara (P-622)

References

External links

Naval exercises
Military exercises involving the United States
Annual events
Indonesian Navy